Whatever Happened to Green Valley? is a 1973 Australian documentary directed by Peter Weir.

References

External links

Whatever Happened to Green Valley? at Oz Movies
2007 review of film at Sydney Morning Herald

1973 films
Australian documentary films
1973 documentary films
Films directed by Peter Weir
1970s English-language films
1970s Australian films